Sylviidae is a family of passerine birds that includes the typical warblers and a number of babblers formerly placed within the Old World babbler family. They are found in Eurasia and Africa.

Taxonomy and systematics
The scientific name Sylviidae was introduced by the English zoologist William Elford Leach (as Sylviadæ) in a guide to the contents of the British Museum published in 1820. The family became part of an assemblage known as the Old World warblers and was a wastebin taxon with over 400 species of bird in over 70 genera. Advances in classification, particularly helped with molecular data, have led to the splitting out of several new families from within this group. There is now evidence that these Sylvia "warblers" are more closely related to the Old World babblers than the warblers and thus these birds are better referred to as Sylvia babblers, or just sylviids.

A molecular phylogenetic study using mitochondrial DNA sequence data published in 2011 found that the species in the genus Sylvia formed two distinct clades. Based on these results, the ornithologists Edward Dickinson and Leslie Christidis in the fourth edition of Howard and Moore Complete Checklist of the Birds of the World, chose to split the genus and moved most of the species into a resurrected genus Curruca, retaining only the Eurasian blackcap and the garden warbler in Sylvia. They also moved the African hill babbler and Dohrn's thrush-babbler into Sylvia. The split was not accepted by the British Ornithologists' Union on the grounds that "a split into two genera would unnecessarily destabilize nomenclature and results in only a minor increase in phylogenetic information content."

List of species
The family includes 34 species divided into 2 genera: This list is presented according to the IOC taxonomic sequence and can also be sorted alphabetically by common name and binomial.

Description
Sylviids are small to medium-sized passerine birds. The bill is generally thin and pointed with bristles at the base. Sylviids have a slender shape and an inconspicuous and mostly plain plumage. The wings have ten primaries, which are rounded and short in non-migratory species.

Distribution and habitat
Most species occur in Asia, and to a lesser extent in Africa. A few range into Europe.

References

 
Bird families